The Niesehorn is a mountain of the Bernese Alps, located south of Lauenen and Lenk in the Bernese Oberland. It lies north of the Wildhorn, on the chain between the valleys of Saanen and Simmental.

References

External links
 Niesehorn on Hikr

Mountains of the Alps
Mountains of Switzerland
Mountains of the canton of Bern
Two-thousanders of Switzerland